Raymond Henry Williams (31 August 1921 – 26 January 1988) was a Welsh socialist writer, academic, novelist and critic influential within the New Left and in wider culture. His writings on politics, culture, the media and literature contributed to the Marxist critique of culture and the arts. Some 750,000 copies of his books were sold in UK editions alone, and there are many translations available. His work laid foundations for the field of cultural studies and cultural materialism.

Life

Early life 
Born in Pandy, just north of Llanfihangel Crucorney, near Abergavenny, Wales, Williams was the son of a railway worker in a village where all of the railwaymen voted Labour, while the local small farmers mostly voted Liberal. It was not a Welsh-speaking area: he described it as "Anglicised in the 1840s". There was, nevertheless, a strong Welsh identity. "There is the joke that someone says his family came over with the Normans and we reply: 'Are you liking it here?'"

Williams attended King Henry VIII Grammar School in Abergavenny. His teenage years were overshadowed by the rise of Nazism and the threat of war. His father was secretary of the local Labour Party, but Raymond declined to join, although he did attend meetings around the 1935 general election. He was 14 when the Spanish Civil War broke out, and was conscious of what was happening through his membership of the local Left Book Club. He also mentions the Italian invasion of Abyssinia (Ethiopia) and Edgar Snow's Red Star Over China, originally published in Britain by the Left Book Club.

At this time, he was supported the League of Nations, attending a League-organised youth conference in Geneva in 1937. On the way back, his group visited Paris and he went to the Soviet pavilion at the International Exhibition. There he bought a copy of The Communist Manifesto and read Karl Marx for the first time.

In July 1939, he was involved in the Monmouth by-election, helping with an unsuccessful campaign by the Labour candidate, Frank Hancock, who was a pacifist. Williams was also a pacifist at this time, having distributed leaflets for the Peace Pledge Union.

University education 
Williams won a state scholarship to read English at Trinity College, Cambridge, matriculating in 1939. While at Cambridge, he joined the Communist Party of Great Britain. Along with Eric Hobsbawm, he was given the task of writing a Communist Party pamphlet about the Russo-Finnish War. He says in (Politics and Letters) that they "were given the job as people who could write quickly, from historical materials supplied for us. You were often in there writing about topics you did not know very much about, as a professional with words".

At the time, the British government was keen to support Finland in its war against the Soviet Union, while still being at war with Nazi Germany. He took a second (division two) in part one of the tripos in 1941, and, after returning from war service, achieved first-class honours in part two in 1946. He graduated from the University of Cambridge with a BA degree in 1946: as per tradition, his BA was promoted to a Master of Arts (MA Cantab) degree. He was later awarded a higher doctorate by Cambridge; the Doctor of Letters (LittD) degree in 1969.

World War II 
Williams interrupted his education to serve in the Second World War. He enlisted in the British Army in late 1940, but stayed at Cambridge to take his exams in June 1941, the month when Germany invaded Russia. Joining the military was against the Communist party line at the time. According to Williams, his Communist Party membership lapsed without him formally resigning.

When Williams joined the army, he was assigned to the Royal Corps of Signals, which was a typical assignment for university undergraduates. He received initial training in military communications, but was reassigned to artillery and anti-tank weapons. He was chosen to serve as an officer in the Anti-Tank Regiment of the Guards Armoured Division in 1941–1945, being sent into early fighting in the Invasion of Normandy after the D-Day Normandy Landings. He writes in Politics and Letters, "I don't think the intricate chaos of that Normandy fighting has ever been recorded." He commanded a unit of four tanks and mentions losing touch with two of them while fighting against Waffen-SS Panzer forces in the Bocage. He never discovered what happened to them as a withdrawal of troops ensued.

Williams took part in the fighting from Normandy in 1944 and through Belgium and the Netherlands to Germany in 1945. There he was involved in liberating a smaller Nazi concentration camp, which was afterwards used by the Allies to detain SS officers.

He was shocked to find that Hamburg had suffered saturation bombing by the Royal Air Force, not just military targets and docks, as they had been told. He was expecting to be sent to Burma, but as his studies had been interrupted by the war, was instead granted Class B release, which meant immediate demobilisation. He returned to Cambridge, where he found that the student culture had changed from 1941, with the left-wing involvement much diminished.

Adult education and early publications 
Williams received his BA from Cambridge in 1946, and then served as a tutor in adult education at Oxford University's Delegacy for Extra-Mural Studies (1946-1961). Moving to Seaford, Sussex, he gave Workers' Educational Association evening classes in East Sussex in English literature, drama, and later culture and environment. This allowed Williams to write in the mornings, beginning work on novels and what would become cultural studies.

In 1946, he founded the review Politics and Letters, a journal which he edited with Clifford Collins and Wolf Mankowitz until 1948. Williams published Reading and Criticism in 1950; he joined the Editorial Board of the new journal Essays in Criticism. In 1951, he was recalled to the army as a reservist to fight in the Korean War. He refused to go, registering as a conscientious objector. He expected to be jailed for a month, but the Appeal Tribunal panel, which included a professor of classics, was convinced by his case and discharged him from further military obligations in May 1951.

Between 1946 and 1957, he was involved with the film-maker Michael Orrom, whom he had known in Cambridge. They co-wrote Preface to Film, published in 1954, and Williams wrote the script for an experimental film, The Legend, in 1955. This was rejected in July 1956 and he parted company with Orrom shortly afterwards. He wrote a number of novels in this period, but only one, Border Country, would be published.

Inspired by T.S. Eliot's 1948 publication Notes towards the Definition of Culture, Williams began exploring the concept of culture. He first outlined his argument that the concept emerged with the Industrial Revolution in the essay "The Idea of Culture", which resulted in the widely successful book Culture and Society, published in 1958. This was followed in 1961 by The Long Revolution. Williams's writings were taken up by the New Left and received a wide readership. He was also well known as a regular book reviewer for The Manchester Guardian newspaper. His years in adult education were an important experience and Williams was always something of an outsider at Cambridge University. Asked to contribute to a book called My Cambridge, he began his essay by saying: "It was not my Cambridge. That was clear from the beginning."

Academic career 

On the strength of his books, Williams was invited to return to Cambridge in 1961, where he was elected a fellow of Jesus College, Cambridge. He eventually achieved an appointment in the Faculty of English, University of Cambridge, first as Reader in Drama (1967–1974), and then as the University's first Professor of Drama (1974–1983). He was a visiting professor of political science at Stanford University in 1973, an experience he used to effect in his still useful book Television: Technology and Cultural Form (1974).

A committed socialist, he was interested in the relations between language, literature and society, and published many books, essays and articles on these and other issues. Among the main ones is The Country and the City (1973), where chapters on literature alternate with chapters on social history. His tightly written Marxism and Literature (1977) is mainly for specialists, but also sets out his approach to cultural studies, which he called cultural materialism. The book was in part a response to structuralism in literary studies and pressure on Williams to make a more theoretical statement of his position, against criticisms that it was a humanist Marxism, based on unexamined assumptions about lived experience. He makes much use of the ideas of Antonio Gramsci, though the book is uniquely Williams's and written in his characteristic voice. For a more accessible version, see Culture (1981-1982), which develops an argument about cultural sociology, which he hoped would become "a new major discipline". Introducing the US edition, Bruce Robbins identifies it as "implicit self-critique" of Williams's earlier ideas, and a basis on which "to conceive the oppositionality of the critic in a permanently fragmented society".

Concepts and theory

Vocabulary 
Williams was keen to establish the changing meanings of the vocabulary used in discussions of culture. He began with the word culture itself; his notes on 60 significant, often difficult words were to have appeared as an appendix to Culture and Society in 1958. This was not possible, and so an extended version with notes and short essays on 110 words appeared as Keywords in 1976. Those examined included "aesthetic", "bourgeois", "culture", "hegemony", "isms", "organic", "romantic", "status", "violence" and "work". A revised version in 1983 added 21 new words, including "anarchism", "ecology", "liberation" and "sex". Williams wrote that the Oxford English Dictionary (OED) "is primarily philological and etymological," whilst his work was on "meanings and contexts". In 1981, Williams published Culture, where the term, discussed at length, is defined as "a realized signifying system" and supported by chapters on "the means of cultural production, and the process of cultural reproduction".

Debate 
Williams wrote critically of Marshall McLuhan's writings on technology and society. This is the background to a chapter in Television: Technology and Cultural Form (1974) called "The Technology and the Society", where Williams defended his visions against technological determinism, focusing on the prevalence of social over technological in the development of human processes. Thus "Determination is a real social process, but never (as in some theological and some Marxist versions)... a wholly controlling, wholly predicting set of causes. On the contrary, the reality of determination is the setting of limits and the exertion of pressures, within which variable social practices are profoundly affected but never necessarily controlled."

His book Modern Tragedy may be read as a response to The Death of Tragedy by the conservative literary critic George Steiner. Later, Williams was interested in the work of Pierre Bourdieu, although he found it too pessimistic about the possibilities for social change.

Last years 
Williams joined the Labour Party after he moved to Cambridge in 1961, but resigned in 1966 after the new majority Labour government had broken the seafarers' strike and introduced public expenditure cuts. He joined the Vietnam Solidarity Campaign, and wrote the May Day Manifesto (published 1967), along with Edward Thompson and Stuart Hall. It has been claimed that Williams later became a Plaid Cymru member and a Welsh nationalist. He retired from Cambridge in 1983 and spent his last years in Saffron Walden. While there he wrote Loyalties, a novel about a fictional group of upper-class radicals attracted to 1930s Communism.

Williams was working on People of the Black Mountains, an experimental historical novel about people who lived or might have lived around the Black Mountains, his own part of Wales, told through flashbacks featuring an ordinary man in modern times, looking for his grandfather, who has not returned from a hill-walk. He imagines the region as it was and might have been. The story begins in the Paleolithic, and would have come up to modern times, focusing on ordinary people. He had completed it to the Middle Ages by the time he died in 1988. The whole work was prepared for publication by his wife, Joy Williams, then published in two volumes with a postscript briefly describing what the remainder would have been. Almost all the stories were complete in typescript, mostly revised many times by the author. Only "The Comet" was left incomplete and needed small additions for a continuous narrative.

In the 1980s, Williams made important links to debates on feminism, peace, ecology and social movements, and extended his position beyond what might be recognised as Marxism. He concluded that with many different societies in the world, there would be not one, but many socialisms. Influenced partly by critical readings of Sebastiano Timpanaro and Rudolf Bahro, he called for convergence between the labour movement and what was then called the ecology movement.

The Raymond Williams Society was founded in 1989 "to support and develop intellectual and political projects in areas broadly connected with Williams's work". Since 1998 it has published Key Words: A Journal of Cultural Materialism, which is "committed to developing the tradition of cultural materialism" he originated. The Raymond Williams Centre for Recovery Research opened at Nottingham Trent University in 1995. The Raymond Williams Foundation (RWF) supports activities in adult education; it was originally formed in 1988 as the Raymond Williams Memorial Fund. A collaborative research project building on Williams's investigation of cultural keywords called the "Keywords Project", initiated in 2006, is supported by Jesus College, University of Cambridge, and the University of Pittsburgh. Similar projects building on Williams's legacy include the 2005 publication, New Keywords: A Revised Vocabulary of Culture and Society, edited by the cultural-studies scholars Tony Bennett, Lawrence Grossberg, and Meaghan Morris, and the Keywords series from New York University Press including Keywords for American Cultural Studies.

In 2007 a collection of Williams's papers was deposited at Swansea University by his daughter Merryn, herself a poet and author.

Works

Novels

Literary and cultural studies 
 
 
 
  – new edition with new introduction
  – reissued with additional footnotes
  – translated into Spanish
 
  – new edition, without play Koba and with new afterword
 
 
 
 
 
 
 
 
  – translated into Spanish and Portuguese
 
 
  – translated into Traditional Chinese, Italian, Korean and Swedish
 
 
  – translated into Portuguese, Spanish, Italian and Korean
 
  – reissued as 
 Culture, Fontana New Sociology Series, Glasgow, Collins, 1981. US edition, The Sociology of Culture, New York, Schocken, 1982 – translated into Spanish
 
 
 
 
 
 
 
 
 
  – translated into Spanish

Short stories 
 "Red Earth", Cambridge Front, No. 2, 1941
 "Sack Labourer", English Short Story 1, W. Wyatt, ed., London: Collins, 1941
 "Sugar", R. Williams, M. Orrom and M. J. Craig, eds, Outlook: a Selection of Cambridge Writings, Cambridge, 1941, pp. 7–14
 "This Time", New Writing and Daylight, No. 2, 1942–1943, J. Lehmann, ed., London: Collins, 1943, pp. 158–164
 "A Fine Room to be Ill In", English Story 8, W. Wyatt (ed.), London, 1948
 "The Writing on the Wall", Colours of a New Day: Writing for South Africa, Sarah LeFanu and Stephen Hayward, eds, London: Lawrence & Wishart, 1990

Drama 
 Koba (1966), Modern Tragedy, London, Chatto and Windus
 A Letter from the Country, BBC Television, April 1966, Stand, 12 (1971), pp. 17–34
 Public Enquiry, BBC Television, 15 March 1967, Stand, 9 (1967), pp. 15–53

Introductions 
 Seven-page introduction to All Things Betray Thee, a novel by Gwyn Thomas

See also 
 Anti-capitalism

References

Sources

Further reading

Book-length treatments 
 Maria Elisa Cevasco, Para ler Raymond Williams (Portuguese of To Read Raymond Williams) São Paulo, Paz e Terra, 2001
 Eagleton, Terry, editor. Raymond Williams: Critical Perspectives. Boston: Northeastern University Press, 1989
 J. E. T. Ethridge, Raymond Williams: Making Connections. New York: Routledge, 1994
 Jan Gorak, The Alien Mind of Raymond Williams. Columbia, Missouri: University of Missouri Press, 1988
 John Higgins, Raymond Williams: Literature, Marxism and Cultural Materialism. London and New York, Routledge, 1999
 Fred Inglis, Raymond Williams. London and New York: Routledge, 1995
 Paul Jones, "Raymond Williams's Sociology of Culture: A Critical Reconstruction". London: Palgrave, 2004
 David Lusted, ed., Raymond Williams: Film, TV, Culture, London: British Film Institute, 1989
 Don Milligan, Raymond Williams: Hope and Defeat in the Struggle for Socialism, Studies in Anti-Capitalism, 2007
 Andrew Milner, Re-Imagining Cultural Studies: The Promise of Cultural Materialism, London: Sage, 2002
 W. John Morgan and Peter Preston, eds. Raymond Williams: Politics, Education, Letters, Macmillan Press,  and St Martin's Press, 1993
 Alan O'Connor, Raymond Williams: Writing, Culture, Politics. Oxford and New York: Blackwell, 1989
 Alan O'Connor, Raymond Williams. Critical Media Studies. Rowman and Littlefield, 2005
 Tony Pinkney, ed., Raymond Williams. Bridgend, Mid Glamorgan, UK: Seren Books, 1991
 Politics and Letters (London, New Left Books, 1979) gives the author's own account of his life and work.
 Dai Smith, Raymond Williams: A Warrior's Tale. Cardigan: Parthian, 2008
 Nick Stevenson, Culture, Ideology, and Socialism: Raymond Williams and E.P. Thompson. Aldershot, England: Avebury, 1995
 Nicolas Tredell, Uncancelled Challenge: the work of Raymond Williams. Nottingham: Paupers' Press, 1990. 
 J. P. Ward, Raymond Williams in the Writers of Wales series. University of Wales Press, 1981
 Daniel Williams, ed., Who Speaks for Wales?: Nation, Culture, Identity, Cardiff: University of Wales Press, 2003
 Stephen Woodhams, History in the Making: Raymond Williams, Edward Thompson and Radical Intellectuals 1936–1956, Merlin Press 2001

Articles 
 Craig, Cairns, Peripheries, in Cencrastus No. 9, Summer 1982, pp. 3–9,

External links 

 The Raymond Williams Society
 Raymond Williams Archive at Swansea University
 Museum of Broadcast Communications article about Raymond Williams 
 Maurice Cowling on Raymond Williams
 Selections from Keywords
 Raymond Williams Centre for Recovery Research
 Raymond Williams page at The Literary Encyclopedia
 Raymond Williams Worldcat Identity
 Raymond Williams at 100 Welsh Heroes
 The Raymond Williams Foundation
 Videos of Raymond Williams – Keywords Project – University of Pittsburgh and Jesus College, Cambridge
 The Raymond Williams' book collection is housed at Special Collections and Archives, Cardiff University.

1921 births
1988 deaths
20th-century British short story writers
20th-century British novelists
20th-century British philosophers
Academics of the University of Cambridge
Alumni of Trinity College, Cambridge
British anti-capitalists
Anti-consumerists
British Army personnel of World War II
Welsh Marxists
Communist Party of Great Britain members
Ecosocialists
Fellows of Jesus College, Cambridge
Literary theorists
Marxist theorists
Marxist writers
Mass media theorists
People from Abergavenny
Philosophers of culture
Philosophers of language
Philosophers of literature
Political philosophers
British social commentators
Social philosophers
Welsh communists
Welsh conscientious objectors
Welsh literary critics
Welsh male novelists
Welsh scholars and academics
Welsh short story writers
Welsh socialists
Royal Corps of Signals officers
Utopian studies scholars
Welsh academics of English literature